The 1991 Copa Interamericana was the 14th. edition of the Copa Interamericana. The final was contested by Mexican Club Puebla (winner of 1991 CONCACAF Champions' Cup) and Chilean club Colo-Colo (champion of 1991 Copa Libertadores). The final was played under a two-leg format in September 1992. 

The first leg was held in Estadio Olímpico in Villahermosa, where Colo-Colo easily beat Puebla 4–1. The second leg was played at Estadio Monumental David Arellano in Santiago, with another Colo-Colo win over Puebla (3–1). With two wins and a 7–2 aggregate score, the Chilean side won their first Interamericana trophy.

Qualified teams

Venues

Match details

First Leg

Second Leg

References

Copa Interamericana
i
i
i
i